Naskreckia is a genus of South African bush crickets belonging to the tribe Meconematini (subfamily Meconematinae).

Species
The Orthoptera Species File lists the following species:
 Naskreckia farrelli (Naskrecki, Bazelet, Spearman (2008) – Farrell's delicate katydid, type species (as Amyttacta farrelli from Bolobedu District, (previously Lebowa), Limpopo Province)
 Naskreckia marakelensis (Naskrecki, Bazelet & Spearman, 2008) – Marakele delicate katydid

References

Meconematinae
Tettigoniidae genera
Orthoptera of Africa